Masistyloides is a genus of parasitic flies in the family Tachinidae. There are at least two described species in Masistyloides.

Species
These two species belong to the genus Masistyloides:
 Masistyloides excavatum Mesnil, 1963
 Masistyloides kononenkoi Richter, 1972

References

Further reading

 
 
 
 

Tachinidae
Articles created by Qbugbot